Tribulations of a Chinaman in China is an adventure novel by Jules Verne, first published in 1879. The story is about a rich Chinese man, Kin-Fo, who is bored with life, and after some business misfortune decides to die.

Plot summary
Kin-Fo is an extremely wealthy man who certainly does not lack material possessions. However, he is terribly bored and when news reaches him about his major investment abroad, a bank in the United States, going bankrupt, Kin-Fo decides to die. He signs up for a $200,000 life insurance covering all kinds of accidents, death in war, and even suicide; the philosopher Wang (Kin-Fo's old mentor) and Kin-Fo's fiancée are to be the beneficiaries. He rejects seppuku and hanging as means of dying, and is about to take opium laced with poison when he decides that he doesn't want to die without having ever felt a thrill in his life. Kin-Fo hires Wang (actually a former warrior of the Taiping Rebellion) to murder him before the life insurance expires.

After a while news reaches Kin-Fo that the American bank he had invested in was not bankrupt, but instead had pulled off a stock market trick and is now wealthier than ever. Unfortunately, Wang has already disappeared. Together with two bodyguards assigned by the insurance company, and his loyal but lazy and incompetent servant Soun, Kin-Fo travels around the country in an effort to run away from Wang and the humiliation from the affair.

One day he receives a message from Wang, stating that he can't stand the pain of having to kill one of his friends, and instead decided to take his own life while giving the task of killing Kin-Fo to a bandit he once knew. Kin-Fo, Soun and the two bodyguards now try to get to the bandit, planning to offer money in return for his life. The ship they travel with is hijacked, and they are forced to use their life vests with built-in sails to return to land.

After being kidnapped by the bandit they were looking for, they are blindfolded and returned to Kin-Fo's home, where his old friends (including Wang, who we now find out staged this entire history to teach him a lesson about how valuable life is) are waiting for him. He marries his young, beautiful fiancée after all and they live happily ever after.

Style
The book is a traditional adventure, similar in style to Around the World in Eighty Days, one of the author's better-known books. However, it does contain more humour as well as criticism of topics such as the British opium trade in China.

Translations 
An English translation was serialized in The Leisure Hour in 1880.

Film versions 
A 1965 film starring Jean-Paul Belmondo, Up to His Ears, was loosely based on this novel. 

A 1987 film, The Tribulations of a Chinese Gentleman, was directed by Wu Yigong, starring Chen Peisi, Rosalind Chao and Rolf Hoppe.

Films with similar plots 

 Flirting with Fate (1916)
 The Man in Search of His Murderer (1931)
 The Whistler (1944)
 You Only Live Once (1952)
 Five Days (1954)
 The Odd Job (1978)
 Tulips (1981)
 I Hired a Contract Killer (1990)
 Bulworth (1998)
 Shut Up and Shoot Me (2005)

References

External links

E-text of Tribulations of a Chinaman in China in various languages at the Jules Verne Virtual Library.
 
The Adventures of a Chinaman in China

1879 French novels
French novels adapted into films
Novels by Jules Verne
Novels set in the Qing dynasty